Purnima Pandey (born 16 October 1997) is an Indian weightlifter.  Purnima Pandey created eight national records on the way to a gold in the women's +87kg category at the  2021 Commonwealth Weightlifting Championships at Tashkent. In July 2022 she placed sixth in the women's +87kg weightlifting event at the 2022 Commonwealth Games.

References

Living people
1997 births
Indian female weightlifters
Commonwealth Games competitors for India
Weightlifters at the 2018 Commonwealth Games
Weightlifters at the 2022 Commonwealth Games
20th-century Indian women
21st-century Indian women